Padraig McMahon is a Gaelic footballer from County Laois.

He usually plays at left half back for Laois.

He played Under 21 for Laois in 2005 and also broke onto the senior team that same year.

In 2006, he starred as Ballyroan Gaels won the Laois Senior Football Championship, having captained Ballyroan to the Kelly Cup title in 2004.

McMahon is currently the captain of the Laois senior football team this year. He helped his Laois team to a memorable comeback in the Leinster quarter-finals in Croke Park on 13 June 2010. He got a superb goal that pushed his side to get a draw to force extra time and then a replay.

References

External links
 McMahon captains Ballyroan to Kelly Cup - Laois Nationalist article

Living people
Ballyroan Gaelic footballers
Laois inter-county Gaelic footballers
1984 births